Cooeeimbardi is a rural locality in the Somerset Region, Queensland, Australia. In the  Cooeeimbardi had a population of 7 people.

Geography 
The Brisbane River forms the western and southern boundaries of the locality.

The northern and eastern parts of the locality is mostly undeveloped mountainous country, including the following named peaks:
 Mount Boorran 
 Mount Somerset 
 Point Deception .

This land is mostly part of the Deer Reserve National Park.

The southern and western areas of the locality are on lower flatter land (approx 70–80 metres above sea level). This land is freehold and predominantly used for grazing cattle.

History 
Cooembardie Provisional School opened on 27 July 1927. On 1 September 1928 it became Cooembardie State School. It closed in March 1953. It was east of Cooeeimbardi Road at approx .

In the  Cooeeimbardi had a population of 7 people.

References

Further reading 

  — also includes Mount Beppo State School, Ivorys Creek Provisional School, Cross Roads Provisional School, Ottaba Provisional School, Murrumba State School, Mount Esk Pocket School, Kipper Provisional School, Lower Cressbrook School, Fulham School, Sandy Gully State School, Cooeeimbardi State School, Scrub Creek State School

Suburbs of Somerset Region
Localities in Queensland